Gabriel Alexander Bywaters (2 September 1914 — 2 November 2004) was an Australian politician who represented the South Australian House of Assembly seat of Murray from 1956 to 1968 for the Labor Party.
 
If just 21 LCL votes were Labor votes in Murray at the 1968 election, Labor would have formed majority government.

References

External links
 Transcript of radio interview with Bernard O’Neil

1914 births
2004 deaths
Members of the South Australian House of Assembly
Australian Labor Party members of the Parliament of South Australia